The soundtrack of the Emmy and Golden Globe award-winning American television medical drama series Nip/Tuck created by Ryan Murphy for FX Networks was mixed by the DJ duo Gabriel & Dresden and the collaborations of other artists.

Track listing

References

Nip/Tuck
Television soundtracks
2003 soundtrack albums
Gabriel & Dresden albums